Gilberton is a rural locality in the City of Gold Coast, Queensland, Australia. In the  Gilberton had a population of 25 people.

Geography
It is well-watered by a number of creeks. Most of the land use is growing sugarcane with a small area of grazing on native vegetation in the west of the locality.In the  Gilberton had a population of 25 people.

History
In the  Gilberton had a population of 25 people.

Environmental issues

Gilberton has acid sulphate soil in naturally water-logged conditions. The lowering of the water table due to drainage work on the Pimpama River allows oxidisation of the iron sulfide to create sulphuric acid which can, in turn, enable the release of iron, aluminium and other heavy metals, doing damage to both the natural and built environment. Application of lime to neutralise low pH levels and the maintenance of broad shallow drains to reduce oxidisation are used to mitigate the problem.

Gold Coast Intra Regional Transport Corridor
The proposed Gold Coast Intra Regional Transport Corridor will connect Gold Coast suburbs from Coomera to Carrara with a multi-modal urban arterial road by 2031. It is proposed to reserve a land corridor from Coomera to Stapylton for future extensions; on current plans, this land corridor will pass through Gilberton near the confluence of Sandy Creek and Halfway Creek.

References

Suburbs of the Gold Coast, Queensland
Localities in Queensland